The Jack DeJohnette Piano Album is an album by Jack DeJohnette with Eddie Gómez and Freddie Waits recorded in 1985 and released on the Landmark label. This is DeJohnette's first album playing piano exclusively, rather than his more familiar drums.

Reception 

The Allmusic review by Scott Yanow states "This album was a surprise when it was released for it features drummer Jack DeJohnette exclusively on piano and synthesizer in a trio... DeJohnette on a couple of the tunes was among the very first pianists to really capture the sound of Thelonious Monk. Other selections are more in his own style and he displays a strong technique that does not sound like the work of a drummer who is moonlighting... Worth checking out.".

Track listing
All compositions by Jack DeJohnette except where noted
 "Minority" (Gigi Gryce) - 8:32
 "Lydia" - 3:46
 "Countdown" (John Coltrane) - 2:38
 "Spiral" (Coltrane) - 7:03
 "Time After Time (Cyndi Lauper, Rob Hyman) - 4:00
 "Milton" - 5:05
 "Ahmad The Terrible" - 6:45
 "Quiet Now" (Denny Zeitlin) - 5:52

Personnel 
 Jack DeJohnette - piano, synthesizer
 Eddie Gómez - bass (tracks 1-7)
 Freddie Waits - drums (tracks 1-7)

References 

Jack DeJohnette albums
1985 albums
Landmark Records albums
Albums produced by Orrin Keepnews